John Lewis Benjamin Tabart (30 November 1827 – 9 September 1894), was an English cricket player, who played five games of first-class cricket for Tasmania.

He has the distinction of having played in the first ever first-class cricket match in Australia. In the extremely low-scoring match, his attacking 15 not out in the second innings, after Tasmania had lost six wickets for 15 in pursuit of 36 for victory, was crucial.

John Tabart died on 9 September 1894 in Launceston, Tasmania at the age of 66.

See also
 List of Tasmanian representative cricketers

References

External links
 Cricinfo Profile
 John Tabart at Cricket Archive

1827 births
1894 deaths
English cricketers
Tasmania cricketers
People from St Pancras, London